Sagartiogeton undatus is a species of sea anemone in the family Sagartiidae. The species was originally described by Otto Friedrich Müller in 1778

Distribution
Sagartiogeton undatus is found on all British coasts and is widespread throughout western Europe from Scandinavia to the Mediterranean.

Description
Sagartiogeton undatus has a base with a diameter of up to 60 mm and can grow to a height of 120 mm or more.

References

External links 
 

Sagartiidae
Cnidarians of the Atlantic Ocean
Fauna of the Mediterranean Sea
Animals described in 1778
Taxa named by Otto Friedrich Müller